"U Got the Look" is a song by American musician Prince. It opens the second disc of Prince's double album Sign o' the Times (1987), and became the album's runner-up chart single. Musically, the song is a standard 12-bar rock song with emphasis on the contrast between heavy drum beats by a Linn LM-1 drum machine and Sheila E.'s live percussion, and a vastly distorted almost completely saturated guitar sound. Although not credited on the single release, the song also features Scottish recording artist Sheena Easton. Prince sings in his sped-up "Camille" voice, although the song was not intended for the Camille album. The lyrics recite the familiar "boy versus girl in the World Series of love" line. (Coincidentally, the 1987 World Series came to Prince's hometown of Minneapolis a few months after the song was released.)

The music video for the song featuring Sheena Easton was filmed in Paris, France, and was directed by American music video director David Hogan. It was included in the film Sign "☮" the Times, and features the intro from the extended version of the song. The entire video is portrayed to be a dream sequence by Prince, dozing off in his dressing room. In the United States, the single went to number 2 on the Billboard Hot 100 singles tally, the week of October 17, 1987, right behind "Lost in Emotion" by Lisa Lisa and Cult Jam. The single stayed in the top 10 of the chart for six weeks.

The extended version of the song (called the "Long Look") is similar to the video but has an additional musical section in the middle of the song with Sheena Easton's vocal, and continues for a few more seconds instead of fading out at the end. The "Long Look" was included on the Ultimate compilation album in 2006.

The B-side of the single was the P-funk-influenced album track, "Housequake". The song was considered for release as the first single from the unreleased Camille album, and therefore, arguably holds a place of importance in Prince's album history, considering the events that followed the creation of the track. The 12-inch also included an extension of the song called "7 Minutes Mo'Quake", which was a mostly instrumental version with the end of the album version tacked on. The remix is noteworthy for some of Atlanta Bliss's trumpet solos, which often were included in live versions of the song. Leaked versions of an unedited "original version" (often called "Camille's Mix") are attainable on the internet.

When Prince performed this song live, he incorporated "I Can't Stand Myself".

Track listings
7-inch: Paisley Park / 7-28289 (US)
 "U Got the Look" – 3:46
 "Housequake" (edit) – 3:24

12-inch: Paisley Park / 0-20727 (US)
 "U Got the Look" (Long Look) – 6:45
 "U Got the Look" (Single Cut) – 3:46
 "Housequake" (Album Cut) – 4:38
 "Housequake" (7 Minutes MoQuake) – 7:15

12-inch: Warner Bros. / W8289T (UK)
 "U Got the Look" (Long Look) – 6:45
 "Housequake" (7 Minutes MoQuake) – 7:15
 "U Got the Look" (Single Cut) – 3:46
*Also available as a picture disc (W8289TP)

Personnel
 Prince – vocals, producer, composer, arranger
 Sheila E. – percussion
 Sheena Easton – uncredited vocals

Charts

Weekly charts

Year-end charts

References

Prince (musician) songs
Sheena Easton songs
Songs written by Prince (musician)
1987 singles
Music videos directed by David Hogan
MTV Video Music Award for Best Male Video
Paisley Park Records singles
Warner Records singles
Song recordings produced by Prince (musician)
Male–female vocal duets
American new wave songs